The Congregational Church at 300 E. Simpson St. in Lafayette, Colorado was listed on the U.S. National Register of Historic Places in 1983 as part of a multiple property submission, the . It has served as a church,
meeting hall, hospital, and library. It has been restored and remodeled for use as the Mary Miller Theater, home of the Theater Company of Lafayette.

History
The church was founded in 1890. The town's founder, Mary Miller, provided most of the funds to establish the church, arranged for its construction, and paid the minister's salary for several years. It was a community meeting place for the mining community. The church served as a medical shelter building during the 1918 influenza plague. In 1923, a small library was established in the building. The church was sold to the Christian Science Society in 1928.

References

Congregational churches in Colorado
Churches on the National Register of Historic Places in Colorado
Churches completed in 1890
Churches in Boulder County, Colorado
National Register of Historic Places in Boulder County, Colorado
Lafayette, Colorado